Herbert Griffiths (14 April 1899 – 1 January 1969) was a British organist and composer and arranger of classical music, theatre music and film music.

Herbert Griffiths was born in Southport, England. He studied music and organ under Benjamin Lofthouse and Herbert Frederick Ellingford at the Royal College of Music and the Oxford University. He later was a renowned organist who received Associateship (ARCO) and Fellowship Diplomas (FRCO) from the Royal College of Organists and he recorded several records of famous organ music for broadcasts in the late 1920s on the organ of the Stoll Picture Theatre (now named Peacock Theatre).

He also composed and arranged music from his early years. He started with traditional forms like a String Quartet in B minor in 1920 but became more famous in later years for his work on light classical music and music for films.
A well-known work is the operetta A Kiss in Spring, which was originally composed by Emmerich Kálmán, but for a performance series at the Alhambra Theatre in 1932 Herbert Griffiths reworked the score together with Constant Lambert. The performance also included some ballet scenes choreographed by Frederick Ashton and was danced by Alicia Markova, Harold Turner, Walter Gore and Prudence Hyman.
Herbert Griffiths also composed the music and conducted the orchestra for an ice skating and cabaret show titled St. Moritz – Ice Musical Spectacle that took place at the London Coliseum in 1937.

Herbert Griffths worked also for films and created music for Such Is the Law (1930), Black in the Face (1954), Five O'Clock Finish (1954), That's an Order (1955), Playground Express (1955), The Stripes of Sgt. Schweiger (1956) and The Baroness (1956).

References 

1899 births
1969 deaths
British male classical composers
British classical organists
British male organists
Light music composers
British film score composers
20th-century classical composers
20th-century British composers
British male film score composers
Musicians from Southport
20th-century organists
20th-century British male musicians
Male classical organists